
Wieliczka County is a unit of territorial administration and local government (powiat) in Lesser Poland Voivodeship, southern Poland. It came into being on January 1, 1999, as a result of the Polish local government reforms passed in 1998.

As of 2006 its total population is 105,266, out of which the population of Wieliczka is 19,133, that of Niepołomice is 8,537, and the rural population is 77,596.

Neighbouring counties
Wieliczka County is bordered by Bochnia County to the east, Myślenice County to the south, and the city of Kraków and Kraków County to the north-west.

Administrative division
The county is subdivided into five gminas (two urban-rural and three rural). These are listed in the following table, in descending order of population.

References
Polish official population figures 2006

 
Wieliczka